The Yass River, a perennial river that is part of the Murrumbidgee catchment within the Murray–Darling basin, is located in the Southern Tablelands and South Western Slopes districts of New South Wales, Australia.

Course and features

The river rises in rugged country south west of Bungendore, near Wamboin and flows generally north north west then south west, joined by seven minor tributaries, towards its confluence with the Murrumbidgee River into the impounded waters of Lake Burrinjuck, west of Yass; dropping  over its  course.

Etymology
A number of competing theories exist as to the origin of the name "Yass". It is believed to be named after an Aborigine commented to explorer, Hamilton Hume, that "Yass boss, plains". An alternative theory is that Yass was named after comments made by Mr Angel, a member of Hume's exploration party, that "Yas, yas, plenty of clear country here". A third theory is that the local Aboriginal Gandangara people used the words Yarrh or Yharr as the name for the river, literally translated to mean "running water".

See also

List of rivers of Australia
List of rivers of New South Wales (L–Z)
Rivers of New South Wales

References

External links
 

Rivers of New South Wales
Tributaries of the Murrumbidgee River
Rivers in the Riverina
Yass Valley Council